Vitharana is a surname. Notable people with the surname include:

Dilshan Vitharana (born 1978), Sri Lankan cricketer
Tissa Vitharana (born 1934), Sri Lankan physician and politician
Vini Vitharana (1928–2019), Sri Lankan linguist